Danilo Lazović (25 November 1951 – 25 March 2006) was a Serbian actor. He is best remembered by his role of Šćepan Šćekić in the Yugoslav TV series Srećni ljudi.

Political views
During the Yugoslav wars, he strongly supported both Slobodan Milošević and his friend and politician Radovan Karadžić and was also a member of an organisation with the goal to show the world the truth about Karadžić. He saw Karadžić as the rightful president of Republika Srpska, which in his thoughts is and must be Serbian.

Death
On 25 March 2006, he died of a heart attack in Belgrade, at the age of 54.

Filmography
 Jagoda u supermarketu
 Virtualna stvarnost
 Tajna porodičnog blaga
 Three Tickets to Hollywood
 Mala
 Poslednji krug u Monci
 Timočka buna
 Igmanski marš
 Laf u srcu
 Sveto Mesto 
 Srećni Ljudi

References

External links

1951 births
2006 deaths
People from Prijepolje
Serbian male actors